Skarvhøi is a mountain in Lom Municipality in Innlandet county, Norway. The mountain is surrounded by several other notable mountains including Eisteinhovde and Veslekjølen to the southwest; Ilvetjørnhøi to the south; Gråvåhø, Grjothovden, and Saukampen to the southeast; and Kvitingskjølen to the south. The name loosely translates to "Scarf Hill" in English.

See also
List of mountains of Norway

References

Lom, Norway
Mountains of Innlandet